All I Need Is Time is the tenth studio album by American R&B quartet Gladys Knight & the Pips, released in June 1973 (see 1973 in music) by Motown Records on the Soul Records label.

Shortly after Gladys Knight & the Pips switched to Buddah Records, their former label released this album. The title track "All I Need Is Time" was released as a single. Motown intended to release another single, "Here I Am Again", but it was cancelled.

The album contains the covers "Heavy Makes You Happy" (The Staple Singers) and "Thank You (Falletin Me Be Mice Elf Agin) (Sly and the Family Stone).

Track listing

Personnel
Arrangers
David Van DePitte - arrangement on "I'll Be Here (When You Get Home)"
Artie Butler - arrangement on "All I Need Is Time" and "Oh! What a Love I Have Found"
H.B. Barnum - arrangement on "Heavy Makes You Happy" and "The Only Time You Love Me Is When You're Losing Me"
Tom Baird - arrangement on "Here I Am Again" and "There's a Lesson to Be Learned"
James Anthony Carmichael - arrangement on "The Singer"
Paul Riser - arrangement on Thank You "(Falettin Me Be Mice Elf Agin)"

Charts

Singles

References

External links 
 All I Need Is Time at Discogs

1973 albums
Gladys Knight & the Pips albums
albums produced by Hal Davis
albums produced by Johnny Bristol
albums arranged by H. B. Barnum
albums arranged by Paul Riser
Soul albums by American artists